The Niddesa (abbrev., "Nidd") is a Buddhist scripture, part of the Pali Canon of Theravada Buddhism. It is included in the Sutta Pitaka's Khuddaka Nikaya. It is in the form of a commentary on parts of the Suttanipata. The tradition ascribes it to the Buddha's disciple Sariputta. It is divided into two parts:

 Maha Niddesa (mahā-) (abbrev., "Nidd I" or "Nd1"), commenting on the Atthaka Vagga ("Octet Chapter," Sn 4);
 Culla or Cula Niddesa (abbrev., "Nidd II" or "Nd2"), commenting on the Parayana Vagga ("Way to the Far Shore Chapter,"Sn 5) and Khaggavisana Sutta ("Rhinoceros Horn Discourse," Sn 1.3).

This text is believed to have been most likely composed no later than the 1st century BC.

References

Sources
 Hinüber, Oskar von (2000). A Handbook of Pāli Literature. Berlin: Walter de Gruyter. .
 De la Vallee Poussin, L.,  Thomas, E.J., ed. (1916), "Niddesa I, Mahaniddesa", Vol. 1, The Pali Text Society, London, Oxford University Press. (Pali edition)
 De la Vallee Poussin, L.,  Thomas, E.J., ed. (1917), "Niddesa I, Mahaniddesa", Vol. 2, The Pali Text Society, London, Oxford University Press. (Pali edition)
 De la Vallee Poussin, L.,  Thomas, E.J., ed. (1916), "Niddesa II, Cullaniddesa", Vol. 3, The Pali Text Society, London, Oxford University Press. (Pali edition)

External links
 Link to a small excerpt from the Niddesa that has been translated into English:
 Access to Insight
 Link to full English-language translation:

See also
 Atthakavagga and Parayanavagga
 Khaggavisana Sutta 
 Sutta Nipata

Khuddaka Nikaya